The 2016–17 Ohio Bobcats women's basketball team will represent Ohio University during the 2016–17 NCAA Division I women's basketball season. The Bobcats, led by fourth year head coach Bob Boldon, will play its home games at the Convocation Center in Athens, Ohio as a member of the Mid-American Conference. They finished the season 22–9, 12–6 in MAC play to finish in second place in the East Division.

Preseason
The preseason coaches' poll and league awards were announced by the league office on October 27, 2016. Ohio was picked first in the MAC East.

Preseason women's basketball coaches poll
(First place votes in parenthesis)

East Division
 Ohio (9) 69
 Buffalo (3) 60
 Akron 48
 Bowling Green 30
 Miami 27
 Kent State 18

West Division
 Central Michigan (12) 72
 Ball State 53
 Toledo 53
 Western Michigan 34
 Northern Illinois 25
 Eastern Michigan 15

Regular Season Champion
Central Michigan (6), Ohio (5), Buffalo (1)

Tournament champs
Central Michigan (7), Ohio (4), Buffalo (1)

Preseason All-MAC 

Source

Roster

Schedule

|-
!colspan=9 style=| Exhibition

|-
!colspan=9 style=| Non-conference regular season

|-
!colspan=9 style=| MAC regular season

|-
!colspan=9 style=| MAC Tournament

Awards and honors

Weekly Awards

All-MAC Awards 
After the season Cece Hooks won an unprecedented 4th MAC defensive player of the year.

Source

See also
2016–17 Ohio Bobcats men's basketball team

References

Ohio
Ohio Bobcats women's basketball seasons
2017 Women's National Invitation Tournament participants
Ohio Bobcats women's basketball
Ohio Bobcats women's basketball